Renfrew was a royal burgh that returned one commissioner to the Parliament of Scotland and to the Convention of Estates.

After the Acts of Union 1707, Renfrew, Dumbarton, Glasgow and Rutherglen formed the Glasgow district of burghs, returning one member between them to the House of Commons of Great Britain.

List of burgh commissioners
Renfrew was represented at meetings on 6 April 1478, 2 April 1481, 2 December 1482, 9 May 1485, 1 October 1487 and 6 October 1488, though the commissioners' names are unknown.
 1579: John Spreull
 1587: John Gilchrist of Sandford
 1593: John Jackson
 1612, 1617, 1621: William Somerville
 1633, 1667: Robert Hall of Fulbar
 1639–41, 1645–47, 1649: John Spreull
 1640, 1644, 1661: Andrew Semple
 1643, 1644: John Somerville
 1645: James Lauder
 1665 convention, 1678 convention: John Somerville of Townhead, provost
 1667 convention, 1681, 1685–86: Robert Hall of Fulbar, provost
 1669–74: Robert Pollock of Milburne
 1689 (convention), 1689–95: William Cochrane of Kilmaronock
 1698: Patrick Houston, provost (died c.1699)
 1700–02: James Campbell of Burnbank and Boquhan
 1702–07: Colin Campbell of Woodside

References
Margaret D. Young ed., The Parliaments of Scotland: Burgh and Shire Commissioners, volume 2 (Edinburgh, 1993) p. 785.

See also
 List of constituencies in the Parliament of Scotland at the time of the Union

Burghs represented in the Parliament of Scotland (to 1707)
History of Renfrewshire
Politics of Renfrewshire
Constituencies disestablished in 1707
1707 disestablishments in Scotland